Enwang (Enwan) and Uda are a Lower Cross River language of Nigeria. The two varieties are quite distinct.

Uda was the subject of a month-long intensive field methods course through CoLang (the Institute on Collaborative Language Research) in 2012 at the University of Kansas. The course relied on two native speakers from Nigeria.

References

Lower Cross River languages
Languages of Nigeria
Oron languages